Peter Wallsten is an American journalist and author who is currently a senior politics editor at The Washington Post. He was previously a White House correspondent.

Early life and education 
Wallsten was brought up in Chapel Hill, North Carolina, and graduated from the University of North Carolina in 1994.

Career 
Wallsten started his career writing for the Miami Herald, St. Petersburg Times, Charlotte Observer and the Congressional Quarterly.

He became a White House correspondent for the Los Angeles Times in 2004, and authored, with Tom Hamburger, One Party Country: The Republican Plan for Dominance in the 21st Century.

Wallsten joined The Wall Street Journal in 2009 as a national political reporter before moving to the Post to become a White House correspondent in 2010. He was appointed a senior politics editor in 2013.

Personal life 
Wallsten is partially blind as a result of Stargardt disease, which is a genetically inherited form of macular degeneration. In June 2006, this caused an exchange of words with President George W. Bush at a White House press conference. Unaware of the journalist's medical condition, the president questioned Wallsten's need to wear sunglasses when the sun wasn't visible. Bush later apologized for the incident.

References

External links 
Some of Peter Wallsten's reporting

Living people
American blind people
Los Angeles Times people
Year of birth missing (living people)